Share The Love is a contemporary new age music relaxation album by Sri Lankan Spiritual Music Composer Rev.Bibiladeniye Mahanama, released on March 10, 2014. These twelve meaningful, well researched music compositions are mainly for the concentration of the human mind, and its theme “Share The Love” was adapted for the sole purpose of, to love the environment as thyself.

Track list
A Graceful Moon
Share the Love
Pilgrim's Path
Life's Satisfaction
Feather in the Wind
Dance of the Shrubs
Deliverance
Equanimity
After the Quake
A Feeling
Autumn's Fall (bonus track)
Desert Sand (bonus track)

Personnel

Musicians
John Anthony (Steel, Nylon guitar)
Dinesh Subasinghe (Violin)
Warren Van Gramberg (Keyboard, piano)
Mohan Premathilake (Guitar)
Nimantha Heshan (Vocals)
Gayan Fernando (Bass guitar)
Kasun Primaal (Vocals)
Dilshan Malith (Violin)
Nuwan Balasuriya (Flute)
Praneeth Saranga (Violin)
Tharindya Amarathunga (Vocals)
Senanga Dissanayake (Piano)
Dumal Warnakula (Vocals)
Raween Kanishka (Vocals)
Meena Prasadini (Vocals)
Chandra Thilakarathne (Violin)
Lashitha Abegunawardhana (Violin)
Indika Rajintha (Flute)

Engineers
Ruwan Walpola – Natural Fx Designer
Nick Gasmena - Mastering Engineer

References

2014 albums
New-age albums